Artillery Battalion may refer to the following military units:

Artillery Battalion (Belgium)
Artillery Battalion, 1st Infantry Brigade (Estonia)
25th Artillery Battalion (Estonia)
General Romualdas Giedraitis Artillery Battalion, Lithuania
Artillery Battalion (Norway)

See also
Artillery
Battalion